The Central High School Neighborhood Historic District in Little Rock, Arkansas comprises the area surrounding Little Rock Central High School. The area was designated to provide historic context to the National Historic Landmark school.  It includes the restored Magnolia Gas Station, which was a staging area for the media during the school integration crisis of 1957. Until the early 21st century, this building served as the National Park Service visitor center for the historic district. Residences in the surrounding area include bungalows, Tudor Revival and Colonial Revival styles.

References

Geography of Little Rock, Arkansas
Historic districts on the National Register of Historic Places in Arkansas
Little Rock Central High School
National Register of Historic Places in Little Rock, Arkansas